Nodaviridae is a family of nonenveloped positive-strand RNA viruses. Vertebrates and invertebrates serve as natural hosts. Diseases associated with this family include: viral encephalopathy and retinopathy in fish. There are nine species in the family, assigned to two genera.

History
The name of the family is derived from the Japanese village of Nodamura, Iwate Prefecture where Nodamura virus was first isolated from Culex tritaeniorhynchus mosquitoes.

Virology

Structure
The virus is not enveloped and has an icosahedral capsid (triangulation number = 3) ranging from 29 to 35 nm in diameter. The capsid is constructed of 32 capsomers.

Genome 

The genome is linear, positive sense, bipartite (composed of two segments – RNA1 and RNA2) single stranded RNA consisting of 4500 nucleotides with a 5’ terminal methylated cap and a non-polyadenylated 3’ terminal.

RNA1, which is ~3.1 kilobases in length, encodes a protein that has multiple functional domains: a mitochondrial targeting domain, a transmembrane domain, an RNA-dependent RNA polymerase (RdRp) domain, a self-interaction domain and an RNA capping domain. In addition, RNA1 encodes a subgenomic RNA3 that encodes protein B2, an RNA silencing inhibitor.

RNA2 encodes protein α, a viral capsid protein precursor, which is auto-cleaved into two mature proteins, a 38 kDa β protein and a 5 kDa γ protein, at a conserved Asn/Ala site during virus assembly.

Life cycle
Viral replication is cytoplasmic. Entry into the host cell is achieved by penetration into the host cell. Replication follows the positive stranded RNA virus replication model. Positive stranded RNA virus transcription, using the internal initiation model of subgenomic RNA transcription is the method of transcription. Vertebrates and  invertebrates serve as the natural host. Transmission routes are contact and contamination.

Taxonomy
The members of the genus Alphanodavirus were originally isolated from insects while those of the genus Betanodavirus were isolated from fish. A small number of nodoviruses seem to lie outside either of these clades. Flock house virus (FHV) is the best studied of the nodaviruses. There are nine species in this family, assigned to two genera:

 Alphanodavirus
 Black beetle virus
 Boolarra virus
 Flock House virus
 Nodamura virus
 Pariacoto virus
 Betanodavirus
 Barfin flounder nervous necrosis virus
 Redspotted grouper nervous necrosis virus
 Striped jack nervous necrosis virus
 Tiger puffer nervous necrosis virus

References

External links
 ICTV Report: Nodaviridae
 Viralzone: Nodaviridae

 
Virus families
Fish viral diseases
Insect viral diseases
Riboviria